Guides Catholiques de Belgique (GCB) is the French speaking Catholic Girl Guiding movement in Belgium, open to all from age five since 1979. In most sections it is girls-only, and it is active mainly in the Walloon region and Brussels. 

GCB is a member of the GSB (French: Guidisme et Scoutisme en Belgique / Dutch: Gidsen- en Scoutsbeweging in België / German: Pfadfinderinnen und Pfadfinder in Belgien / English: Guiding and Scouting in Belgium), and it is a founding-member (1928) of the World Association of Girl Guides and Girl Scouts (WAGGS).

The Albanian Shoqata e Guidave dhe Skoutëve në Shqipëri Girl Guiding association's development is supported by the GCB and the Italian Associazione Guide e Scouts Cattolici Italiani.

References

External links
http://www.gcb.be/

Scouting and Guiding in Belgium
World Association of Girl Guides and Girl Scouts member organizations
Catholicism in Belgium